Kiddie Kwela is a Philippine children's show and broadcast on TV5 which has run from November 25, 2008 to March 30, 2010. The show was presented by Bayani Agbayani.

See also
List of programs aired by TV5 (Philippine TV network)

References

Philippine children's television series
2008 Philippine television series debuts
2010 Philippine television series endings
TV5 (Philippine TV network) original programming
Filipino-language television shows